Leucadendron elimense, the Elim conebush, is a flower-bearing shrub, which belongs to the genus Leucadendron and forms part of the fynbos. The plant is native to the Western Cape, South Africa.

Description
The shrub blooms from July to September. The seeds are stored in a toll on the female plant and only fall to the ground two months after the flower has ripened. The seeds could possibly be collected by rodents. The plant is unisexual and there are separate plants with male and female flowers, which are pollinated by small insects.

Distribution and habitat
The plant occurs on the Elim Plain from Gansbaai to Bredasdorp.

Subspecies
Leucadendron elimense subsp. elimense
Leucadendron elimense subsp. nova
Leucadendron elimense subsp. salteri
Leucadendron elimense subsp. vyeboomense

References

External links

elimense